Abdul Fattah Jasin or Fatah Jasin (26 June 19153 May 1980) was an Indonesian politician and Islamic cleric who served as Minister of Social Affairs during the Second Ali Sastroamidjojo Cabinet.

Biography

Early career
Jasin was born in Surabaya on 26 June 1915 and received Islamic education in madrasa and pesantren. He was the son of a well-known ulama in Surabaya. After completing his education, he taught at a madrasa in Sampang before returning to Surabaya, where he taught at a madrasa affiliated with Nahdlatul Ulama. From 1939 until the Japanese takeover in 1942, he was a merchant in the city, and between 1938 and 1942 he was a member of the Gerindo political organization. Jasin was arrested and apparently sentenced to death during the Japanese occupation by the Japanese forces, but the surrender of Japan and the ensuing independence of Indonesia occurred before he could be executed.

Old Order
During the Indonesian National Revolution, he was for a time chief of political education in the Indonesian Navy and managed a cigarette factory. After the handover of sovereignty, Jasin became a city councillor in Surabaya and continued to work as a merchant. Within Nahdlatul Ulama (NU), he participated in the Ansor Youth Movement and the NU Farmers' Association. He took part in the 1955 legislative election and was elected to the People's Representative Council, but he became an inactive member when he was appointed minister, and less than a month after the swearing in he was replaced by another NU politician.

Initially, the Nahdlatul Ulama nominated Zainul Arifin as Minister of Social Affairs in the newly formed Second Ali Sastroamidjojo Cabinet. However, protestations from Masyumi resulted in Jasin being appointed instead. During the Guided Democracy period, Jasin served as a Minister for Liaison with Ulama, a position he would hold from the establishment of the Working Cabinet on 9 July 1959 to the initial reshuffle of the Dwikora Cabinet on 1 October 1965. He was assistant under coordinating or deputy prime ministers after the cabinet's reshuffle, until he no longer held a cabinet seat after the Ampera Cabinet was established.

Death
Jasin died in his home in Surabaya on 3 May 1980 and was buried in a public cemetery of the city on 4 May with a military funeral. At the time of his death, he had two wives and six children.

References

1915 births
1980 deaths
People from Surabaya
Social affairs ministers of Indonesia
Nahdlatul Ulama
Government ministers of Indonesia
Members of the People's Representative Council, 1955
Indonesian Sunni Muslims
Members of Indonesian city councils